Thure Riefenstein is an actor, director, writer and producer. He was born in Germany with an Austrian-Serbian background.

Biography / film / theatre
Riefenstein graduated 1989 as an actor in Germany, worked for five years on stage in repertory and Berlin Broadway theaters (see below) and continued studying acting and film in New York and Los Angeles. He since has been working internationally for cinema, television and theater in the United States, Canada, Germany, Great Britain, France, Italy, Austria, Russia, Czech Republic, Sweden, Serbia, Morocco and Turkey.

Important features in leading parts are the US-Canadian feature Sophie (director: Leif Bristow) with John Rhys-Davies and Deborah Kara Unger. In the Golden Czech Lion Award winning WW2 drama Dark Blue World, he played for director and Academy Award Winner Jan Sverák and in the action thriller Hostile Takeover he worked with director Carl Schenkel. In the US-German feature Baltic Storm (Dir.: Reuben Leder) he took a leading part aside Greta Scacchi, Jürgen Prochnow, and Donald Sutherland. In 2012 he worked with Academy Award Winner Steven Soderbergh in Behind the Candelabra and played with Michael Douglas, Matt Damon and Dan Aykroyd. In 2017-2018 he played August on the feature Willie and Me directed by Eva Hassmann, starring country song icon Willie Nelson and in 2018 he finished shooting the part of the Captain in the epic WW2 movie Torpedo, aka U-235 (release: Oct. 23rd 2019), directed by Sven Huybrechts.

Mr. Riefensteins acclaimed TV-work includes the French period movie Julie, chevalier de Maupin (Dir.: Charlotte Brändström), where he starred with Marisa Berenson, Pierre Arditi and Gottfried John and which achieved an 'International Emmy Award' nomination for best foreign film. The TV production series Kommissarin Lucas (Detective Lukas) with Thure Riefenstein as the male leading detective, achieved the highly acclaimed German Adolf Grimme Award nomination for Best Film. In the Film  he was nominated in the category Best Lead Male Actor (Bambi Audience Award 2009 & Quotenmeter Award 2010) and was also semi finalist for the International Emmy Award 2010 in the same category as Best Lead Male Actor. He guest starred in the US-Series Leverage (TNT) with Academy Award Winner Timothy Hutton and also in The Brink (HBO) where he played with Academy Award Winner Tim Robbins. In the Sci-Fi series 12 Monkeys he guest starred as SS-Sturmbannführer Waesch in the episode Die Glocke with Barbara Sukowa and Amanda Shull.

Mr. Riefenstein also starred in the European action drama mini-series Crusaders (Dir.: Dominique Othenin-Girard) with Armin Mueller-Stahl and Franco Nero, the successful feature comedy 666: In Bed with the Devil (Dir.: Rainer Matsutani), the Canadian film Criminal Instinct (Dir.: Brad Turner) with Victor Garber or in the science fiction feature Ainoa (Dir.: Marko Kalantari).

Riefenstein is a trained theater actor and has performed theater-plays such as Shakespeare's Pericles, Brecht's Life of Galileo, Walter Jens's The Downfall, Ariane Mnouchkine's Mephisto and also in musicals such as Linie 1 or the revue The Blue Angel where he played with Ute Lemper at the Berlin Broadway theater Theater des Westens and the Hamburger Schauspielhaus. The legendary show was directed by European theater icons Peter Zadek and Jérôme Savary. Riefenstein also worked with Bertolt Brechts former assistant Peter Palitzsch on Pericles at the Berliner Ensemble and with Vlad Mugur on Carlo Goldoni's The Liar. His latest theatre work was in Captains Greedys Carnival (2018), a production of Tim Robbins Actors Gang.

He lived in London to practice in fringe theatre and in New York to work with Kristin Linklater. His American debut was in the New Yorker production of Jean Genet's The Maids for the Berkshire Theatre Festival. In Los Angeles he studied acting at the ACI based on Lee Strasberg's and Sandford Meisner’s working techniques and worked with several coaches such as Doug Warhit, Sam Christensen, Bruce Davison or Michelle Danner. He trained in the Actors Gang, Culver City with Cynthia Ettinger and Tim Robbins were he worked as an associate member for a year.

Riefenstein also is an established Voice Over Actor and works as director, producer and writer for film.

He is married to Patricia Lueger (maiden name) and has a son named Paris Aaron Lazar Riefenstein (b. 2003).

Filmography (excerpts) 
1998: Oskar und Leni (Nomination for Adolf Grimme Award, Nomination for Max Ophüls Award), (theatrical)
1998: Best of the Best 4: Without Warning (theatrical)
1998: Doppeltes Spiel mit Anne (movie for TV)
1998: Romantic Fighter (movie for TV)
1998: Pensacola: Wings of Gold  (movie for TV), USA, Dir.: James Brolin, Cast: James Brolin, Sandra Hess, Kenny Johnson, a.o.
1998: Gefährliche Lust – Ein Mann in Versuchung (movie for TV)
1999: Der letzte Zeuge: Die Erpressung (movie for TV)
1999: Kein Weg zurück (movie for TV)
2000:  (DE, IT), (movie for TV)
2000: Anna H. – Geliebte, Ehefrau und Hure (movie for TV)
2000: Hostile Takeover (theatrical)
2000:  (movie for TV)
2001: The Crusaders (DE, IT), (Mini Series) Dir.: Dominique Othenin Girard, Cast: Allesandro Gassman, Armin Mueller-Stahl, Franco Nero, Uwe Ochsenknecht, a.o.
2001: Dark Blue World (CZ, GB) (Czech Golden Lion, European Film Award, u. a.), (theatrical) Dir.: Jan Sverak, Cast: Ondrej Vechtry, Kristoff Hadek, Tara Fitzgerald, Charles Dance, a.o.
2001: The Wandering Soul Murders (CAN), (Golden Reel Award, USA), (movie for TV) Dir: Brad Turner, Cast: Wendy Crewson, Victor Garber, a.o.
2002: Seven Moves to Checkmate (movie for TV)
2003: Baltic Storm (DE), (theatrical) Cast: Greta Scacchi, Jürgen Prochnow, Donald Sutherland, a.o.
2003: Ainoa (A), (theatrical)
2003: Heiraten macht mich nervös (Marrying makes me nervous),  (movie for TV)
2003: Kommissarin Lucas: Die blaue Blume (movie for TV, special)
2003: Im Namen des Herrn (movie for TV)
2003: Polizeiruf 110: Tiefe Wunden (Adolf Grimme Award), (movie for TV)
2004: Kommissarin Lucas: Vertrauen bis zuletzt (movie for TV, special)
2004: Kommissarin Lucas: Vergangene Sünden (movie for TV, special)
2004: Rose unter Dornen (movie for TV)
2004: Julie, Chevalier de Maupin (France) (nomination for "international Emmy Award"), (Mini Series) Dir.: Charlotte Brandström, Cast: Sarah Biasini, Pierre Arditi, Jürgen Prochnow, Marissa Berenson, Gottfried John, a.o.
2006: Kommissarin Lucas: Das Verhör (Grimmepreis nomination), (movie for TV, special)
2006: Kommissarin Lucas: Skizze einer Toten (movie for TV, special)
2006: Wachgeküsst (movie for TV)
2007: Alarm für Cobra 11: Todfeinde  (movie for TV)
2007: Kommissarin Lucas: German Angst (movie for TV)
2007: Kommissarin Lucas: Das Totenschiff (movie for TV, special)
2008: Kommissarin Lucas: Wut im Bauch (movie for TV, special)
2008: Der Amokläufer (movie for TV)
2008: Jack Hunter and the Lost Treasure of Ugarit  (mini series), Sci-fi Channel (US release) Dir.: Terry Cunningham, Cast: Ivan Sergei, Joanne Kelly, a.o.
2008: Jack Hunter and the Star of Heaven (mini series), Sci-fi Channel (US release)
2008: Jack Hunter and the Quest for Akhenaten's Tomb (mini series), Sci-fi Channel (US release) Cast: Ivan Sergei, Joanne Kelly, a.o.)
2009: A Date for Life (movie for TV)
2009: ,  TV-Event Film, nomination for "Bambi audience award 2009", Quotenmeter Award: "Best lead actor"
2009: High Society Murder – Das eitle Gesicht des Todes (movie for TV)
2009:  (movie for TV)
2010: The Whore (Event-movie for TV)
2011: Inga Lindström: Das dunkle Haus (movie for TV)
2011: Machtergreifung (Hitler – The Takeover) (Movie for TV)
2011: Sophie, USA, Canada, (theatrical), Dir.: Leif Bristow, Cast: Brittany Bristow, John Rhys Davies, Augustus Prew, Donna Kara Unger a.o.
2012: Running with the Wind (movie for TV)
2012: Leverage: The Blue Line Job (TNT, USA) Dir.: Mark Roskin, Cast: Timothy Hutton, Gina Bellman, Christian Kane, Beth Riesgraf, Aldis Hoge, a.o.
2013: Behind the Candelabra (USA) Dir.: Steven Soderbergh, Cast: Michael Douglas, Matt Damon, Dan Aykroyd a.o. 
2013: Schwestern, Dir.: Olaf Krainsen, Cast: Sophie Schütt, Alwara Höfels, a.o,
2014: My Whole Half Life (mini series for TV)
2014: The Old Gun (mini series for TV, Russia)
2014: Der Geruch von Erde (feature for TV)
2014: The Old Fox: Der Tod in dir (feature for TV)
2014: Kreuzfahrt ins Glück: Hochzeitsreise nach Dubai
2015: SOKO 5113: Der Rattenfänger (TV-Series)
2015: The Cello Player (Short-Feature, USA)
2015: The Brink: Sticky Wicket (Series, USA), Dir.: Michael Lehmann, Cast: Tim Robbins, Jack Black, a.o.
2016: Inga Lindström: Familienbande (TV-Movie), Dir.: John Delbridge
2016: Der Staatsanwalt: Der Schein trügt (TV-Movie, Ge), Dir.: Martin Kinkel
2016: SOKO Donau: Der Preis der Macht (Series, Ge), Dir.: Erhard Riedlsberger
2016: The Man in the High Castle: Fallout (Series, USA), Dir.: Daniel Percival
2017: X Company: Friendly Fire (Series, Canada), Dir.: Stephanie Morgenstern
2017: Kept Boy (Feature, US), Dir.: George Bamber
2017: Die Chefin: Glaube, Liebe, Hoffnung (Series, Ge), Dir.: Florian Kern
2017: Letzte Spur Berlin: Ehrenamt (Series, Ge), Dir.: Peter Ladkani
2017: Die Spezialisten: Diamantenfieber (Series, Ge), Dir.: Kerstin Ahlrichs
2018: Cologne P.D.: Fatale Begierde (Series, Ge), Dir.: Joerg Mielich
2018: 12 Monkeys: Die Glocke (Series, USA), Dir.: David Grossman, Terry Matalas
2019: Die Spezialisten: Gespenster (Series, Ge), Dir.: Steffi Doehlemann
2018/2019: Willie and Me (Feature, USA), Dir.: Eva Hassman 
2019: ENEME (Feature, Ge, RUS), Dir.: Jakob Gisik
2019: TORPEDO aka U-235 (Feature, Be), Dir.: Sven Huybrechts
2021: V2. Escape from Hell: Kommandant Berghoff

Director/Writer/Producer (excerpts) 
 1994: Lonely Nights (comedy, English) (German Board of film Classification: "Highly Precious Movie")
 2003: God is no Soprano (comedy, English) (Filmfestival Audience Award; German Film Classification: "Highly Precious Movie")
 2007: Hagen (writer, producer)
 2015: Leon (writer, producer)

References
https://www.tvguide.com/tvshows/12-monkeys/cast/682067/
https://www.argunners.com/trailer-torpedo-u235-2019/

Sources and external links

Thure Riefenstein website

1965 births
Living people
People from Langenau
German male film actors
German male stage actors
German male television actors
German people of Austrian descent
German people of Serbian descent
20th-century German male actors
21st-century German male actors